El Triunfo is a town, with a population of 10,040 (2020 calculation), and a municipality in the Honduran department of Choluteca.

This small town is located close to the Nicaraguan border.

References 

Municipalities of the Choluteca Department